Mountain Island Educational State Forest (MIESF) is a  North Carolina State Forest in Mount Holly, North Carolina.

References

Nearby state parks
The following state parks and state forests are within  of Mountain Island Educational State Forest:
Crowders Mountain State Park
Kings Mountain State Park, South Carolina
Lake Norman State Park

External links 
 

North Carolina state forests
Protected areas of Gaston County, North Carolina
Protected areas of Lincoln County, North Carolina
Education in Gaston County, North Carolina
Education in Lincoln County, North Carolina